Sikander Bakht (24 August 1918 – 23 February 2004) was an Indian politician belonging to the Bharatiya Janata Party (BJP) who served as the 15th governor of Kerala from 2002 until his death. He was elected as the Vice President of the BJP, served as its leader in the Rajya Sabha, and as a cabinet minister in the NDA government headed by Atal Bihari Vajpayee. In 2000, he was awarded Padma Vibhushan, the second highest civilian honour of the Government of India.

Early life
Sikander Bakht was born in Quresh Nagar in  Delhi, India in 1918. He attended the Anglo Arabic Senior Secondary School, Delhi and completed his Bachelor of Science from the Anglo-Arabic College (now known as Zakir Husain College) in Delhi. During his school and college days he was a keen hockey player and represented Delhi University and Delhi in various tournaments. He also played and captained the Independents Hockey Club. He once said he is member of BJP and always maintained that India is land of secularism and supported the ethos of India.

Political career
In 1952, Bakht was elected to the Municipal Corporation of Delhi as a Congress candidate. In 1968 he was elected as the Chairman of Delhi Electric Supply Undertaking. In 1969 the Congress party split and Bakht stayed with Congress (Organisation). Bakht was then elected to The Metropolitan Council of Delhi as a Congress (O) candidate. On 25 June 1975, Emergency was declared by Prime Minister Indira Gandhi, Bakht along with other opposition leaders was imprisoned on 25 June 1975. He was lodged in the Rohtak Jail until his release in December 1976. Prime Minister Indira Gandhi ordered General Elections in March 1977. As soon as the opposition leaders were released, they merged all opposition parties to form The Janta Party.

In March 1977, Bakht was elected to the Lok Sabha (the lower house of Indian Parliament) as a Janata Party candidate, from Chandni Chowk in New Delhi. Morarji Desai was appointed Prime Minister and he appointed Bakht as a Cabinet Minister for Works, Housing, Supply and Rehabilitation. He served in this capacity till July 1979.

In 1980 the Janta Party split and Bakht opted to be with the Bharatiya Janata Party (BJP). He was appointed General Secretary of BJP. In 1984 he was made the Vice President of BJP.

In 1990 Bakht was elected to the Rajya Sabha (the upper house of the Indian Parliament) from Madhya Pradesh. In 1992 he became the Leader of Opposition in the Rajya Sabha. (The Leader of Opposition is equivalent to Cabinet Minister's post.) On 10 April 1996 he was reelected from Madhya Pradesh to the Rajya Sabha.

In May 1996, Atal Bihari Vajpayee offered Bakht the post of Minister of Urban Affairs when he formed his government. Bakht, however, demanded a higher post, and on 24 May he was given the additional post of Minister of Foreign Affairs. The Vajpayee Government lasted only 13 days. Bakht was Foreign Minister for little more than a week, as he was forced to resign when Vajpayee's government collapsed on 1 June 1996. After the collapse of the Vajpayee government, Bakht became the Leader of the Opposition in the Rajya Sabha once again.

In 1998 Vajpayee was again appointed Prime Minister and Bakht was appointed Industry Minister, a post he held until 2002. In addition, he was appointed the Leader of the House in Rajya Sabha. After serving an entire term as Industries Minister, Bakht retired from active politics and was appointed the Governor of Kerala in 2002. He was the first BJP leader ever to be appointed the governor of Kerala.

Awards
In 2000 Bakht was awarded the Padma Vibhushan. This is the second highest Indian civilian award. The four other persons from the BJP who have been awarded the Padma Vibhushan are Atal Bihari Vajpayee, Lal Krishna Advani, Sushma Swaraj and Arun Jaitley. Atal Bihari Vajpayee has since been awarded Bharat Ratna, the highest civilian award of India.

Death
Bakht finished his term in Rajya Sabha on 9 April 2002. 9 days later, he was sworn in as Governor of Kerala, succeeding Sukhdev Singh Kang. He was highly popular and served in this post until his death. Bakht died in the Medical College Hospital in Kerala's capital city Thiruvananthapuram on 23 February 2004, from complications of intestinal surgery which was performed on 19 February. He was the first Governor of Kerala who died in office. He was replaced two days later by Karnataka governor T. N. Chaturvedi. There was concern, particularly among BJP members, that Bakht might have died because of medical negligence, but nothing was proven. Chief Minister A. K. Antony, at the time of Sikander Bakht's death, had to give into popular demand to order an inquiry to examine if there was any lapse on part of doctors or any other motive.

The President of India, A. P. J. Abdul Kalam, said "In his death we have lost a prominent public personality and a statesman." Prime Minister Vajpayee said "Mr. Bakht was a freedom-fighter. He struggled for democracy and the nationalist cause with courage and conviction. He rendered distinguished service as a member of my Cabinet for sometime."

See also
 Arif Beg
 Farooq Khan

References

External links
'Politics today is the law of the jungle' – Sikander Bakht – The Afternoon on Sunday
'GOVERNORS OF KERALA'
'Probe ordered in Sikander Bakht's sudden death'
'Kerala Gov Sikandar Bakht dead'
'Leaders condole Sikander Bakht's death'

1918 births
2004 deaths
20th-century Indian Muslims
Governors of Kerala
Bharatiya Janata Party politicians from Delhi
Recipients of the Padma Vibhushan in public affairs
India MPs 1977–1979
Indian National Congress politicians
Janata Party politicians
Indian National Congress (Organisation) politicians
Lok Sabha members from Delhi
Rajya Sabha members from Madhya Pradesh
Leaders of the Opposition in the Rajya Sabha
Rajya Sabha members from the Bharatiya Janata Party
Ministers for External Affairs of India
Commerce and Industry Ministers of India